Tucetona isabellae is a species of clam that was described in 2011 by Paul Valentich-Scott, Curator of Malacology at the Santa Barbara Museum of Natural History (SBMNH), and Elizabeth A. R. Garfinkle, 11th grade student at San Roque High School (also known as Garden Street Academy).

References

Further reading

External links
Garden Street Academy
Santa Barbara Museum of Natural History
Collections and Research Online Databases, Santa Barbara Museum of Natural History

Glycymerididae
Molluscs described in 2011